Anayibe Rojas Valderrama, also known as Omaira Rojas Cabrera (nom de guerre: Sonia) born in the Colombian town of Palestina, Huila Department, on 16 June 1967. She comes from a low-income peasant family and had only completed two years of middle school before joining the FARC guerrilla by the late 1980s.

Capture
She was captured by the Colombian Military on 10 February 2004 in a location called Peñas Coloradas, jurisdiction in the Municipality of Cartagena de Chairá and was taken to the Larandia AB to be interrogated mainly about the three Americans the FARC had kidnapped and about FARC's Secretariat. She was later transferred to many other locations for security reasons.

Extradition

The United States accused "Sonia" of directly negotiating illegal drugs deliveries to Peruvian and Brazilian drug traffickers.
Sonia was handed to U.S. officials on 9 March 2004 at Barranquilla's Airport in northern Colombia.

U.S. Trial
On 20 February 2007, Sonia was convicted of drug charges in a Washington D.C. court.

References

FARC's view of Sonia
Wikinews - Sonia
Sonia Interview
BBC report

}

1967 births
Living people
People from Huila Department
Members of FARC
Women in war in Colombia
Women in warfare post-1945